Sir Brajendra Nath Seal (3 September 1864 – 3 December 1938) was a Bengali Indian humanist philosopher. He served as the second vice chancellor of Mysore University.

He began his career as a lecturer at the Scottish Church College. His research works were published in some of leading journals during the British Raj, such as the Calcutta Review, Modern Review, New India, Dawn, Bulletin of Mathematical Society, Indian Culture, Hindustan Standard, British Medical Journal, Prabasi, Sabuj Patra, and Visva-Bharati.

Life 

Brajendranath Seal was born in Haripal, Hoogly District (in West Bengal), in 1864. His father Mohendranath Seal was one of the earliest followers of Comtean positivism in Bengal. As a student of philosophy at the General Assembly's Institution (now Scottish Church College, Calcutta), he became attracted to Brahmo theology. And along with his better-known classmate and friend Narendranath Dutta, the future Swami Vivekananda, he regularly attended meetings of the Sadharan Brahmo Samaj. Later they would part ways with Dutta aligning himself with Keshub Chunder Sen's New Dispensation (and later on to found his own religious movement, the Ramakrishna Mission) and Seal staying on as an initiated member.

Seal was the inaugural chair of philosophy at India's first graduate school in philosophy at the University of Calcutta. Seal was regarded as 'a versatile scholar in many branches of learning, both scientific and humanistic,' and in his major work The Positive Sciences of Ancient Hindus demonstrated 'interrelations among the ancient Hindu philosophical concepts and their scientific theories.' He was appointed as the principal of Krishnath College in Berhampore.

Seal was the keynote speaker at the first session of the First Universal Races Congress of 1911 on 26 July 1911, which gathered speakers and attendees from across the world to discuss racial issues and encourage international cooperation. Part of his address included the declaration thatWe are assisting at a solemn function, the conferring of a new charter, the charter of the modern conscience, on each race and nation as a member of the world-system.... From this watch-tower of Humanity, we seem to hear the measureless tread of generations behind and before, to witness the universal march and procession of Humanity, at the opening of a new era...Michael Biddiss notes that Seal's opening words 'set the tone of effusion and euphoria' which pervaded much of the Congress as a whole. Seal served as the vice chancellor of Mysore University from 1921 and retired in 1930 following a paralytic stroke.

Books
 A Memoir on the Co-efficient of Numbers: A Chapter on the Theory of Numbers (1891)
 Neo-Romantic Movement in Bengali Literature (1890–91)
 A Comparative Study of Christianity and Vaishnavism (1899)
 New Essays in Criticism (1903)
 Introduction to Hindu Chemistry (1911)
 Positive Sciences of the Ancient Hindus (1915)
 Race-Origin (1911)
 Syllabus of Indian Philosophy (1924)
 Rammohan Roy: The Universal Man (1933)
 The Quest Eternal (1936)

Source:

See also

 List of alumni of Scottish Church College

References

Further reading
Kopf, David. 1979. The Brahmo Samaj and the Shaping of the Modern Indian Mind. Princeton, NJ. Princeton University Press
Scottish Church College Magazine (Year – 1999, 2000, and 2001.Volume – 87, 88, and 89).

External links
Sir Brajendra Nath Seal at the Encyclopædia Britannica
 William Sweet (2003), About Brajendra Nath Seal
 
 Ichhimuddin Sarkar, Acharya Brajendra Nath Seal's Insights on Spiritualism and Humanity: Exposition and Reality, Tawarikh (International Journal for Historic Studies), Vol 8, No. 1(2016).

1864 births
1938 deaths
Bengali Hindus
20th-century Bengalis
19th-century Bengalis
Bengali poets
20th-century Bengali poets
Scottish Church College alumni
Bengali male poets
Brahmos
Indian male essayists
19th-century Indian historians
Indian male poets
19th-century Indian philosophers
Knights Bachelor
Indian Knights Bachelor
People associated with Santiniketan
Writers from Kolkata
University of Calcutta alumni
Academic staff of the University of Calcutta
Academic staff of the University of Mysore
19th-century Indian educational theorists
Academic staff of City College, Kolkata
Bengali writers
Bengali philosophers
19th-century Indian essayists
20th-century Indian philosophers
Scientists from Kolkata
20th-century Indian essayists
20th-century Indian poets
19th-century Indian poets
20th-century Indian historians
19th-century Indian male writers
20th-century Indian educational theorists
Scholars from Kolkata
Neo-Vedanta
Indian humanists